The Los Angeles Conservancy is a historic preservation organization in Los Angeles, California. It works to document, rescue and revitalize historic buildings, places and neighborhoods in the city. The Conservancy is the largest membership based historic preservation organization in the country. The group was formed in 1978 to preserve Los Angeles Central Library, which was threatened with demolition. The organization has over 7000 members and 400 volunteers. There is a volunteer Modern Committee, dedicated to the preservation of postwar architecture as well as a Historic Theaters Committee that produces the annual "Last Remaining Seats" film series of classic films in the historic movie palaces in downtown Los Angeles. The executive director since 1992 has been Linda Dishman. The Conservancy hosts an annual preservation awards ceremony at the Millennium Biltmore Hotel and works closely with the business, political and development communities to find preservation solutions for historic buildings.
Some of the Conservancy's biggest success stories have included Bullocks Wilshire, the Cathedral of Saint Vibiana, the Wiltern Theater and the oldest operating McDonald's in Downey, CA.

In 2006, the L.A. Conservancy won the American Planning Association's Daniel Burnham award, its most prestigious National Planning award.

References

External links
 
 Modern Committee

Non-profit organizations based in Los Angeles
Historic preservation organizations in the United States
Heritage organizations
Architectural history
Urban planning in California
Buildings and structures in Los Angeles
1978 establishments in California
Organizations established in 1978